Galanarla is an extinct genus of quadrupedal kangaroos of Australia.

References

Prehistoric macropods
Marsupials of Australia
Extinct marsupials